Fort Langley Airport  is located adjacent to Fort Langley, British Columbia, Canada. It is a private airport with a single paved runway. It is adjacent to the Fort Langley Water Aerodrome.

See also
 Fort Langley Water Aerodrome

References

Registered aerodromes in British Columbia
Transport in Langley, British Columbia (district municipality)